Daniel Hamilton may refer to:

Daniel Hamilton (Canadian politician) (died 1965), politician in Manitoba, Canada
Daniel W. Hamilton (politician) (1861–1936), U.S. Representative from Iowa
Daniel Hamilton (businessman) (1860–1939), Scotsman known for his work in cooperative system in Gosaba, West Bengal, India
Daniel Hamilton (basketball) (born 1995), American basketball player
Daniel W. Hamilton (lawyer), American lawyer and professor of law